The 2004–05 Czech Cup was the twelfth season of the annual football knock-out tournament of the Czech Republic. The competition offered a place in the first round of the 2005–06 UEFA Cup for the winner.

Teams

Preliminary round
The preliminary round was played on 25 July 2004.

|}

Round 1
The first round was played on 31 July 2004.

|}

Round 2
The second round was played on 22 September 2004.

|}

Round 3
The third round was played on 6 October 2004.

|}

Round 4
The fourth round was played on 27 October 2004.

|}

Quarterfinals
The quarterfinals were played between 20 and 26 April 2005.

|}

Semifinals
The semifinals were played on 11 and 12 May 2005.

|}

Final

See also
 2004–05 Czech First League
 2004–05 Czech 2. Liga

References

External links
 Official site 
 Czech Republic Cup 2004/05 at RSSSF.com

2004–05
2004–05 domestic association football cups
Cup